The men's field hockey tournament at the 2003 Pan American Games was held between 2–13 August 2003 in Santo Domingo, Dominican Republic. The tournament doubled as the qualification to the 2004 Summer Olympics to be held in Athens, Greece.

Argentina won the tournament for the seven time after defeating Canada 1–0. Cuba won the bronze medal after defeating Chile 6–2 in the third place playoff.

Qualification

Umpires
Below are the 11 umpires appointed by the Pan American Hockey Federation:

Enzo Caraveta (ARG)
Tomas Gantz (CHI)
Donny Gobinsingh (TRI)
Jason King (BAR)
Felix Manuel Lora (DOM)
Marcello Servetto (ARG)
Gus Soteriades (USA)
Luis Villa (CUB)
Chris Wilson (CAN)
Philip Schellekens (NED)
Nathan Stagno (GIB)

Results

Preliminary round

Pool A

Pool B

Classification round

Fifth to eighth place classification

Crossover

Seventh and eighth place

Fifth and sixth place

First to fourth place classification

Semi-finals

Bronze-medal match

Gold-medal match

Final standings

 Qualified for the Summer Olympics

Medalists

References

External links
Official website PAHF

Men's tournament
Pan American Games
2003